Poa Island (also called Ostrov Tumannyi or Tumannoi; the native name in Aleut is Saduuĝinax̂) is an islet located about  off the south coast of Akun Island in the Fox Islands group of the eastern Aleutian Islands, Alaska. It was named for a genus of grasses in 1888 by the U.S. Bureau of Fisheries. Captain Tebenkov (1852) called it "Ostrov Tumannyi," meaning "foggy island."

References

Islands of Aleutians East Borough, Alaska
Fox Islands (Alaska)
Islands of Alaska
Islands of Unorganized Borough, Alaska